Arne Lanes (born 29 March 1938) is a Norwegian weightlifter. He competed in the men's middle heavyweight event at the 1960 Summer Olympics.

References

External links
 

1938 births
Living people
Norwegian male weightlifters
Olympic weightlifters of Norway
Weightlifters at the 1960 Summer Olympics
People from Stokke
Sportspeople from Vestfold og Telemark
20th-century Norwegian people